The 2003 IRL IndyCar Series brought some of the biggest changes in its history. The league adopted the name IndyCar Series, after a settlement with CART prohibiting its use had expired. Several former CART teams brought their full operations to the IRL, most notably major squads Chip Ganassi Racing and Andretti Green Racing, as well as former CART engine manufacturers Toyota and Honda, replacing Infiniti who shifted its efforts to the new feeder series Infiniti Pro Series. Many of the IRL's old guard including Robbie Buhl, Greg Ray, and Buddy Lazier had difficulty competing in this new manufacturer-driven landscape. The league also added its first international race this year, taking over the CART date at Twin Ring Motegi.

The season's most successful entrants were Ganassi and Team Penske that had made the switch already the year before. New Zealander Scott Dixon won the opening race of the season at Homestead and ran very consistently all year long to win his first title at the age of 23. Gil de Ferran won Penske's third consecutive Indianapolis 500 in May and finished second to Dixon in the title race. The finale however was marred by a severe incident that nearly killed former series' champion and Indy 500 winner Kenny Bräck. De Ferran won the race with Dixon in second being well enough to seal the title. Bräck would eventually recover; however, Tony Renna, a Ganassi development driver, lost his life in a test crash at Indianapolis after the season had officially ended.

2003 was also the first and only engine title for Toyota and also first Asian and Japanese car manufacturer to won IndyCar Series IRL-era engine manufacturer's title and thus ending seven-year American engine manufacturer's supremacy. As of 2022, 2003 was also the last chassis manufacturer title victory for Panoz G-Force Technologies to date.

Confirmed entries

Season Summary

Schedule 

BOLD indicates Superspeedways.

Race results

Race summaries

Toyota Indy 300
This race was held March 2 at Homestead-Miami Speedway. Tony Kanaan won the pole.

Top ten results
9- Scott Dixon
6- Gil de Ferran
3- Hélio Castroneves
11- Tony Kanaan
8- Scott Sharp
7- Michael Andretti
27- Dario Franchitti
10- Tomas Scheckter
21- Felipe Giaffone
4- Sam Hornish Jr.

Purex Dial Indy 200
This race was held March 23 at Phoenix International Raceway. Tony Kanaan won the pole.

Top ten results
11- Tony Kanaan
3- Hélio Castroneves
21- Felipe Giaffone
31- Al Unser Jr.
15- Kenny Bräck
2- Jaques Lazier
8- Scott Sharp
23- Sarah Fisher
52- Buddy Rice
5- Shigeaki Hattori

Inaugural Indy Japan 300
This race was held April 13 at Twin Ring Motegi. Scott Dixon won the pole.

Top ten results
8- Scott Sharp
15- Kenny Bräck
21- Felipe Giaffone
7- Michael Andretti
31- Al Unser Jr.
4- Sam Hornish Jr.
27- Dan Wheldon
12- Tora Takagi
13- Greg Ray
24- Robbie Buhl

87th Indianapolis 500
The 87th Indy 500 was held May 25 at the Indianapolis Motor Speedway. Hélio Castroneves sat on pole but came up just short of the three-peat in the 500.

Top ten results
6- Gil de Ferran
3- Hélio Castroneves
11- Tony Kanaan
10- Tomas Scheckter
12- Tora Takagi
20- Alex Barron
32- Tony Renna
13- Greg Ray
31- Al Unser Jr.
55- Roger Yasukawa

Bombardier 500
This race was held June 7 at Texas Motor Speedway. Tomas Scheckter won the pole.

Top ten results
31- Al Unser Jr.
11- Tony Kanaan
12- Tora Takagi
15- Kenny Bräck
27- Bryan Herta
9- Scott Dixon
3- Hélio Castroneves
6- Gil de Ferran
12- Roger Yasukawa
4- Sam Hornish Jr.

Honda Indy 225
This race was held June 15 at Pikes Peak International Raceway. Tony Kanaan won the pole.

Top ten results
9- Scott Dixon
11- Tony Kanaan
6- Gil de Ferran
27- Dario Franchitti
4- Sam Hornish Jr.
12- Tora Takagi
15- Kenny Bräck
10- Tomas Scheckter
52- Buddy Rice
91- Buddy Lazier

SunTrust Indy Challenge
This race was held June 28 at Richmond International Raceway. Scott Dixon won the pole. The race was originally scheduled for 250 laps, but shortened to 206 laps due to rain.

Top ten results
9- Scott Dixon
3- Hélio Castroneves
6- Gil de Ferran
4- Sam Hornish Jr.
11- Tony Kanaan
21- Felipe Giaffone
15- Kenny Bräck
26- Dan Wheldon
52- Buddy Rice
31- Al Unser Jr.

Kansas Indy 300
This race was held July 6 at Kansas Speedway. Scott Dixon won the pole.

Top ten results
27- Bryan Herta
3- Hélio Castroneves
6- Gil de Ferran
11- Tony Kanaan
15- Kenny Bräck
9- Scott Dixon
55- Roger Yasukawa
13- Greg Ray
10- Tomas Scheckter
5- Jaques Lazier

Firestone Indy 200
This race was held July 19 at Nashville Superspeedway. Scott Dixon won the pole.

Top ten results
6- Gil de Ferran
9- Scott Dixon
3- Hélio Castroneves
26- Dan Wheldon
21- Alex Barron
15- Kenny Bräck
12- Tora Takagi
31- Al Unser Jr.
11- Tony Kanaan
10- Tomas Scheckter

Firestone Indy 400
This race was held July 27 at Michigan International Speedway. Tomas Scheckter won the pole.

Top ten results
21- Alex Barron
4- Sam Hornish Jr.
10- Tomas Scheckter
8- Scott Sharp
9- Scott Dixon
12- Tora Takagi
6- Gil de Ferran
12- Roger Yasukawa
31- Al Unser Jr.
13- Greg Ray

Emerson Indy 250
This race was held August 10 at Gateway International Raceway. Hélio Castroneves won the pole.

Top ten results
3- Hélio Castroneves
11- Tony Kanaan
6- Gil de Ferran
10- Tomas Scheckter
26- Dan Wheldon
4- Sam Hornish Jr.
12- Tora Takagi
13- Greg Ray
2- Vítor Meira
8- Scott Sharp

Belterra Casino Indy 300
This race was held August 17 at Kentucky Speedway. Sam Hornish Jr. won the pole.

Top ten results
4- Sam Hornish Jr.
9- Scott Dixon
27- Bryan Herta
31- Al Unser Jr.
3- Hélio Castroneves
11- Tony Kanaan
24- Robbie Buhl
26- Dan Wheldon
6- Gil de Ferran
10- Tomas Scheckter

Firestone Indy 225
This race was held August 24 at Nazareth Speedway. Scott Dixon won the pole.

Top ten results
3- Hélio Castroneves
4- Sam Hornish Jr.
27- Bryan Herta
6- Gil de Ferran
15- Kenny Bräck
31- Al Unser Jr.
26- Dan Wheldon
12- Roger Yasukawa
24- Robbie Buhl
91- Buddy Rice

Delphi Indy 300
This race was held September 7 at Chicagoland Speedway. Richie Hearn won the pole.

Top ten results
4- Sam Hornish Jr.
9- Scott Dixon
27- Bryan Herta
26- Dan Wheldon
10- Tomas Scheckter
11- Tony Kanaan
52- Alex Barron
55- Roger Yasukawa
12- Tora Takagi
24- Robbie Buhl

Toyota Indy 400
This race was held September 21 at California Speedway. Hélio Castroneves won the pole. It was the fastest circuit race ever in motorsport history, with an average speed of 207.151 mph (333.306 km/h) over 400 miles (643.6 km). This also makes it the de facto fastest ever 400 mile motor race beating the NASCAR record set during the 1999 Kmart 400.

Top ten results
4- Sam Hornish Jr.
9- Scott Dixon
11- Tony Kanaan
26- Dan Wheldon
10- Tomas Scheckter
3- Hélio Castroneves
55- Roger Yasukawa
8- Scott Sharp
31- Al Unser Jr.
52- Alex Barron

Chevy 500
This race was held October 12 at Texas Motor Speedway. Gil de Ferran won the pole. The race was memorable for a five–way championship duel involving de Ferran, Scott Dixon, Hélio Castroneves, Tony Kanaan, and two-time titlist Sam Hornish Jr. The race was also notable for a frightening, but non–fatal, accident involving Tomas Scheckter and 1999 Indianapolis 500 champion Kenny Bräck. Scheckter was uninjured, but the Swede was launched into the air after wheel–to–wheel contact on the backstretch and violently clobbered the catch fencing. Debris was scattered across the track, and the already long period of yellow flag laps prompted IRL race control to end the race at lap 195 of 200. Because the race reached 1 lap past the halfway point the race was considered official. Gil de Ferran, Bräck's former title rival in CART, won in his final IndyCar race, joining Ray Harroun and Sam Hanks (both of whom retired immediately after winning an Indianapolis 500) as drivers who retired from U.S. open wheel competition in the winner's circle. Scott Dixon won the IRL title in his first season in the IndyCar Series (having spent two seasons in CART) and Englishman Dan Wheldon beat Roger Yasukawa for Bombardier Rookie of the Year honors.

Top ten results
6- Gil de Ferran
9- Scott Dixon
7- Dan Wheldon
2- Vítor Meira
27- Bryan Herta
8- Scott Sharp
12- Tora Takagi
13- Greg Ray
31- Al Unser Jr.
55- Roger Yasukawa

Final driver standings 

 Ties in points broken by number of wins, followed by number of 2nds, 3rds, etc., and then by number of pole positions, followed by number of times qualified 2nd, etc.

Note:  Tora Takagi had 23 points deducted at Texas Motor Speedway due to unacceptable driving.

See also 
 2003 Indianapolis 500
 2003 Infiniti Pro Series season
 2003 CART season
 2003 Toyota Atlantic Championship season

Footnotes

External links
IndyCar.com – official site
Indianapolis 500 – official site

Indy Racing League
IndyCar Series seasons
 
IndyCar Series